|}

The Floodlit Stakes is a Listed flat horse race in Great Britain open to horses aged three years or older.
It is run at Kempton Park over a distance of 1 mile 3 furlongs and 219 yards (2,414 metres), and it is scheduled to take place each year in November.

The race was first run in 2006 over a distance of 2 miles, and was reduced to its current distance in 2007.

Winners

See also
 Horse racing in Great Britain
 List of British flat horse races

References
Racing Post: 
,, 

Kempton Park Racecourse
Flat races in Great Britain
Open middle distance horse races
2007 establishments in England
Recurring sporting events established in 2007
Horse races in Great Britain